The following tables compare general and technical information for a number of web-based browser synchronizers.  Please see the individual products' articles for further information. Unless otherwise specified in footnotes, comparisons are based on the stable versions.

General

Operating system support

Syncable browsers

Syncable items

Features

History 
History of bookmarks (favorites) sync:
 2020 - Maxthon 1.3
 2020 - Google Browser Sync (extension for Firefox)
 2020 - Opera
 2020 - Firefox
 2020 - Google Chrome
 2020 - Eversync (extension for Firefox)

See also 
Comparison of online backup services
Comparison of file hosting services
Comparison of version-control software
Comparison of file synchronization software

References

Browser synchronizers